The Women's 25 km competition of the open water swimming events at the 2015 World Aquatics Championships was held on 1 August 2015.

Results
The race was started at 08:00.

References

Women's 25 km
World Aquatics Championships
2015 in women's swimming